Juho Lammikko (born 29 January 1996) is a Finnish professional ice hockey winger currently under contract with the ZSC Lions of the National League. He previously played for the Florida Panthers and Vancouver Canucks in the National Hockey League (NHL).

Playing career

Ässät
Lammikko made his Liiga debut with Ässät during the 2013–14 Liiga season, appearing in 20 games and recording an assist.  He also played in 37 games with the Ässät under 20 team, scoring 17 goals and 42 points, followed by three goals and eight points in 11 playoff games. Following the season, Lammikko was drafted by the Florida Panthers in the third round of the 2014 NHL Entry Draft.

Lammikko returned to Ässät at the beginning of the 2015–16 Liiga season, scoring two goals in five games, before returning to his OHL team, the Kingston Frontenacs.

Kingston Frontenacs
Lammikko was drafted 43rd overall by the Kingston Frontenacs of the Ontario Hockey League in the 2014 CHL Import Draft. In his first game with the Frontenacs, Lammikko scored his first career OHL goal against Jason Da Silva of the Peterborough Petes, and added two assists, in a 5–3 victory. Overall, Lammikko appeared in 64 games with Kingston, scoring 18 goals and 44 points, and had a team high +23 rating. In the playoffs, Lammikko had a goal and two points in four games.

Lammikko returned to the Frontenacs for the 2015–16 season, and in 59 games, he scored 22 goals and 55 points.  On 15 February, Lammikko earned his first career hat-trick, scoring three goals against Mackenzie Blackwood of the Barrie Colts in a 6–4 victory, and on 18 March, Lammikko scored two goals and added two assists for four points in a 7–0 win over the Oshawa Generals.  In the post-season, Lammikko scored three goals and seven points in nine games.

Florida Panthers
Lammikko was drafted by the Florida Panthers at the 2014 NHL Entry Draft with the Panthers third round pick, 65th overall.  On 15 April 2016, the Panthers signed Lammikko to a three-year entry level contract, and assigned him to their AHL affiliate, the Portland Pirates. He appeared in one game with the Pirates in the 2015–16 season, earning no points.

After attending the Panthers 2018 training camp, and despite strong pre-season showing Lammikko was initially returned to begin the 2018–19 season with the Springfield Thunderbirds. Lammikko played one game before he received his first NHL recall to the Panthers, due to an injury to Derek MacKenzie on 9 October 2018.

Oulun Kärpät
At the conclusion of his entry-level contract, Lammikko as a restricted free agent, opted to return to Finland to further develop his offensive game. With his rights retained by the Panthers, Lammikko signed a one-year contract with Oulun Kärpät of the Liiga on 12 July 2019. In the 2019–20 season, Lammikko made an instant impact with Kärpät earning Liiga player of the month honours for October. In 57 regular season games with the Liiga leading Kärpät, Lammikko collected 22 goals and 51 points, before the season was cancelled due to the COVID-19 pandemic.

Metallurg Magnitogorsk
With his rights still held by the Panthers, Lammikko opted to continue his career abroad by signing a one-year contract with Russian club, Metallurg Magnitogorsk of the Kontinental Hockey League (KHL) on 4 June 2020. His KHL rights were earlier acquired by Mettalurg from Spartak Moscow on 1 June. In the 2020–21 season, Lammikko in a top-nine forward role, produced 6 goals and 8 points through 22 regular season games.

Return to Florida
With his NHL right's still held by the Panthers, and with the club under new management, Lammikko ended his stint in Russia with Metallurg and returned to the Florida Panthers in agreeing to a one-year, two-way contract on 25 November 2020.

Vancouver Canucks
Prior to the commencement of the  season, on 10 October 2021, Lammikko was traded by the Panthers to the Vancouver Canucks, along with Noah Juulsen, in exchange for Olli Juolevi. Lammikko appeared in a career best 75 games with the Canucks and registered new offensive highs with 7 goals and 8 assists for 15 points.

As a restricted free agent having concluded his contract with Vancouver, Lammikko was not tendered a qualifying offer by the Canucks and was released as a free agent on 11 July 2022.

ZSC Lions
Unable to garner a satisfactory NHL contract, Lammikko returned to Europe after agreeing to a one-year contract with Swiss club, ZSC Lions of the NL, on 4 August 2022.

Career statistics

Regular season and playoffs

International

References

External links

1996 births
Living people
Ässät players
Finnish ice hockey left wingers
Florida Panthers draft picks
Florida Panthers players
Kingston Frontenacs players
Metallurg Magnitogorsk players
Oulun Kärpät players
Portland Pirates players
Springfield Thunderbirds players
Vancouver Canucks players
ZSC Lions players